Toulvaddie  is a hamlet, in the Tarbat peninsula, located in Tain, Ross-shire, Scottish Highlands and is in the Scottish council area of Highland.

Populated places in Ross and Cromarty